"All This Way" is a song performed by Swedish Idol 2011 winner Amanda Fondell and written and produced by Arnthor Birgisson and Idol 2004 runner-up Darin Zanyar. "All This Way" was the winners song of Idol 2011 which meant both Amanda Fondell, Robin Stjernberg and Moa Lignell all recorded a version of the song. The song reached the top of the Swedish Singles Chart. It is also the title track of Fondell's debut album All This Way that reached No. 1 on the Swedish Albums Chart.

Track listing

Chart performance

Weekly charts

Year-end charts

Release history

Other versions

Robin Stjernberg who was runner-up to Amanda Fondell, as well as Moa Lignell who came third, recorded the song prior to the Final 3 live show. Stjernberg's version proved popular after downloads were made available for the versions by Fondell and Stjernberg. Lignell's version was uploaded on YouTube but was eventually deleted due to copyright issues.

Robin Stjernberg also included it in his debut album My Versions that topped the Swedish Albums Chart in week 2/2012 (dated 13 January 2012).

References

2011 songs
Number-one singles in Sweden
Songs written by Arnthor Birgisson
Songs written by Darin (singer)